Boron fiber or boron filament is an amorphous product which represents the major industrial use of elemental boron. Boron fiber manifests a combination of high strength and high elastic modulus.

A common use of boron fibers is in the construction of high tensile strength tapes. Boron fiber use results in high-strength, lightweight materials that are used chiefly for advanced aerospace structures as a component of composite materials, as well as limited production consumer and sporting goods such as golf clubs and fishing rods.

One of the uses of boron fiber composites was the horizontal tail surfaces of the F-14 Tomcat fighter. This was done because carbon fiber composites were not then developed to the point they could be used, as they were in many subsequent aircraft designs.

In the production process, elemental boron is deposited on an even tungsten wire substrate which produces diameters of 4.0 mil (102 micron) and 5.6 mil (142 micron). It  consists of a fully borided tungsten core with amorphous boron.

Boron fibers and sub-millimeter sized crystalline boron springs are produced by laser-assisted chemical vapor deposition. Translation of the focused laser beam allows to produce even complex helical structures. Such structures show good mechanical properties (elastic modulus 450 GPa, fracture strain 3.7%, fracture stress 17 GPa) and can be applied as reinforcement of ceramics or in micromechanical systems.

References 

Fibers